St Martin's Church ( is a Romanesque church from 12th century in Puig-reig, Spain,   near the modern parochial church and the former Puig-reig Castle.

Exterior
The church's construction comprises large stone blocks of various sizes, and its thick side-walls are carried by a number of side-buttresses. The exterior of the church is completely plain, without ornamentation, except at the west wall. Atop the west wall stands the bell-gable with its twin openings, and below it is the main door, which has a simple three-arch archivolt, supported in part by four columns and their capitals.

Interior

The church has a single nave, covered with a barrel vault and finished by a semicircular apse. The apse vault begins as a simple-impost cornice, and is separated from the nave by a triumphal arch. At its rear is a single narrow window, vaulted with a voussoir arch. It still contains some of its original Romanesque murals.

References

External links
 More pictures at Sant Martí de Puig-reig, Art Medieval (in Catalan).

12th-century Roman Catholic church buildings in Spain
Churches in Catalonia
Romanesque architecture in Catalonia
Berguedà